The Bruneian ambassador in Washington, D.C. is the official representative of the Government in Bandar Seri Begawan to the Government of the United States.

List of representatives

See also
Brunei–United States relations

References

Other references

United States
Brunei
Ambassadors